Neita extensa, is a butterfly of the family Nymphalidae. It is found in South Africa from Mpumalanga to Limpopo and further north to Zimbabwe.

The wingspan is 43–48 mm for males and 45–50 mm for females. Adults are on wing from late November to mid-April (with a peak in mid-summer). There is a single extended generation per year.

The larvae probably feed on Poaceae grasses. Larvae have been reared on Ehrharta erecta.

References

Butterflies described in 1898
Satyrini
Butterflies of Africa
Taxa named by Arthur Gardiner Butler